Mierzyn  is a village in the administrative district of Gmina Gryfice, within Gryfice County, West Pomeranian Voivodeship, in north-western Poland.

The village has a population of 28.

See also

History of Pomerania.

References

Mierzyn